Somdet Phra Chao Lan Ther Chaofa Thong-In Krom Phra Rajawang Boworn Sathan Phimuk (lit: His Royal Highness Prince Thong-In, the Deputy Viceroy of Siam) (28 March 1746 – 20 December 1806) was a Siamese Prince and military leader. A nephew of King Phutthayotfa Chulalok (Rama I) the founder of the Chakri Dynasty, he was appointed Deputy Viceroy or Rear Palace, the 3rd highest position in the kingdom. Becoming the only person to hold that title during the Rattanakosin Kingdom.

Life
Thong-In (ทองอิน) was born on 28 March 1746 to an Ayutthayan aristocrat Phra Intraraksa (Seam) and Sa (later Princess Sister Thepsuthavadi; the eldest child of Thongdee and Daoreung). Sa was also the elder sister of Thong Duang, later Chao Phraya Chakri and in 1782 King Phutthayotfa Chulalok. Thong-In was the eldest child and has two younger brothers and a sister. 

For a time Thong-In served in the Army under King Taksin of Thonburi as Luang Ritnaiwair (หลวงฤทธิ์นายเวร). In 1780 he was raised to the rank of  Phraya Suriyaphai (พระยาสุริยอภัย) and was appointed governor of Nakhon Ratchasima. 

When his uncle ascended to the throne as King of the new Rattanakosin Kingdom in 1782, he elevated his nephew to the rank of Chaofa (most senior rank of Prince). Soon he was appointed to the title of Krom Phra Rajawang Boworn Sathan Phimuk and Rear Palace or Deputy Viceroy (Deputy Uparaja), this meant he was essentially the third most powerful individual in the Kingdom. When the new capital was built at Bangkok Prince Anurak Devesh built his residence (Wang Lang) back in Thonburi, directly opposite the Front Palace, today the site is now occupied by the Siriraj Hospital.

After becoming the Rear Palace he assisted King Rama I in his fight against King Bodawpaya of Burma in 1785 during the Nine Armies War. During the conflict he personally accompanied the King to recapture the city of Phitsanulok from the Burmese.

Death
Anurak Devesh died on the 20 December 1806 at the age of 60. After his death King Rama I decided not to appoint anyone to succeed him as Rear Palace and left the office vacant, the tradition was carried by subsequent kings until the official abolishment of the title in 1885 by King Chulalongkorn. Making Anurak Devesh the only Rear Palace of the Chakri Dynasty.

The Prince had 35 children, six borne from his consort Thongyu, others by concubines. Of his six children (borne with Thongyu), the four sons and two daughters received the title of Phra Ong Chao (the middle rank of Princes). The rest (borne with concubines) received the title of Mom Chao (the most junior rank of Princes), however during the reign of King Mongkut (Rama IV), all 35 children was given the additional title of "Royal Cousins" (พระสัมพันธวงศ์เธอ or Phra Samphan Wong Ther).

References
 Translated from the Thai Wikipedia
 วชิราวุธานุสรณ์สาร National Library of Thailand

|-

Rear Palaces
Thai male Chao Fa
1746 births
1806 deaths
18th-century Chakri dynasty
19th-century Chakri dynasty
Non-inheriting heirs presumptive